Ludiès (Occitan: Ludièrs) is a commune in the Ariège department in southwestern France. Ludiès is a rural commune with 94 inhabitants in 2019, having experienced a sharp increase in population since 1975. It is part of the Pamiers attraction area. Its inhabitants are called Ludéens or Ludéennes.

Geography 
The town is located in the department of Ariegè, in the region of Occitania.

Geology and relief
The town is located in the Aquitaine Basin, the second largest sedimentary basin in France after the Paris Basin, the entire territory being covered by superficial formations. The outcropping land on the municipal territory is made up of sedimentary rocks dating from the Cenozoic, the most recent geological era on the geological time scale, beginning 66 million years ago. The detailed structure of the outcropping layers is described in sheet "n°1057 - Pamiers" about the harmonized geological map at approximately about 1/50,000th of the department of Ariège.

Hydrography
The commune is in the watershed of the Garonne, within the Adour-Garonne watershed. It drains in the Caralet river, forming a hydrographic network  in length.

History 
Ludiès is characteristic of the complexity of co-lordships in the Middle Ages. Thus, the Rigaud de Vaudreuil in particular, apart from their seigneury of Trémoulet and a quarter of that of Carlaret, were also half co-lords of Ludiès and Saint-Amadou, it being understood that the other half belonged in joint possession to the King of France, and the other to the Abbey of Saint-Antonin in Pamiers, under the condition of continuing to honor the abbey with a live sparrowhawk on Saint-Antonin's Day.

Politics and administration

Territorial division 
The commune of Ludiès is a member of the community of communes called "The Portes d'Ariège Pyrénées", an inter communal organization headquartered in Pamiers. It is also a member of other grouped intercommunal groups.

Administratively, it belongs to the Ariegè department and Pamiers subprefecture.

Electorally it is under the Pamiers 2 district for electing departmental councillors since the 2015 cantonal rewriting, and the Ariegè second constituency for legislative elections since they were last redrawn in 1986.

Since February 2005, the mayor has been Danielle Bouche, of the Divers gauche party, characteristic of central Occitanie's socialist tendencies.

Population and demographics

In 2019, the town had 94 inhabitants, an increase of 32% compared to 2013 (Ariège: +0.39%, France excluding Mayotte: +2.17%).

See also
Communes of the Ariège department

References

Communes of Ariège (department)
Ariège communes articles needing translation from French Wikipedia